Lillian Li is a Chinese American author. Her novel Number One Chinese Restaurant is an NPR Best Book of 2018, and longlisted for the Women's Prize for Fiction and the Center for Fiction First Novel Prize. She currently lives in Ann Arbor, Michigan.

Early life 
Li was born in Ann Arbor, Michigan, grew up in Maryland. She received her Bachelor of Arts from Princeton University, and her Master of Fine Arts in fiction at the University of Michigan's Helen Zell Writers’ Program.

Career 
Currently, Li is teaching at the University of Michigan. She writes for the Michigan Quarterly Review. Her work has been featured in The New York Times, Granta, One Story, Bon Appétit, Travel + Leisure, The Guardian, Guernica, Glimmer Train, and Jezebel. Number One Chinese Restaurant is her first novel.

The inspiration for writing Number One Chinese Restaurant came from a summer Li spent working twelve-hour shifts at a Peking duck restaurant outside of Washington D.C. In an interview with The Guardian, Li said of the experience, "I was exhausted and demoralised. I’d expected a certain level of mistreatment – I knew how terribly people could act towards waiting staff – but I had not expected them to look right through me and my co-workers, even when they were talking directly to us... But I won't pretend that I experienced the same treatment as my co-workers. I was the only server born in America, with English as my first language, while my co-workers spoke English as a second, third, sometimes fourth language. After I’d spoken a few times to the people I was serving, some of them would start to warm up and actually look me in the eye. This confirmed what I was beginning to realise: that having a Chinese face in a Chinese restaurant added an extra level of alienation."

Notable works 
"Blue Jay," Granta March 5, 2013.
Spark: A Creative Anthology, Volume VII, Empire & Great Jones Little Press, 2016. 
Coach Ray, One Story 2019. 
Number One Chinese Restaurant, Henry Holt and Company, 2020.

Awards 
 Hopwood Award in Short Fiction
 Glimmer Train's New Writer Award

References 

American people of Chinese descent
21st-century American women writers
21st-century American novelists
University of Michigan alumni
Princeton University alumni
Living people
American women novelists
Year of birth missing (living people)